The Necromancer is a comic book published by the Top Cow imprint of Image Comics.

The comic was written by science fiction author and comic writer Joshua Ortega, with art on the first series by Francis Manapul.

Publication history
Necromancer was originally announced back in 2001 with Top Cow president Matt Hawkins as the writer and Brian Ching on art chores.

Necromancer returned in the 2007 "Pilot Season" program from Top Cow. Ortega provided the script and Jonboy Meyers took over on art, as Manapul was on exclusive contract to DC.

Plot

The series follows Abby van Alstine, a teenage girl who discovers that she is part of a mystical subculture among society, possessing several growing powers of her own.

Collected editions
The first series was collected into a trade paperback in April 2007.

Notes

References

External links
Magic Words: Joshua Ortega talks "The Necromancer", Comic Book Resources, October 5, 2005

Reviews
Review of Necromancer #1 and #2, Comics Bulletin